Eugène Louis Bastien (26 October 1881 in Paris– 13 August 1963) was a French racing cyclist and fencer who competed in the late 19th century and early 20th century. He participated in Cycling at the 1900 Summer Olympics in Paris and won the gold medal in the men's 25 kilometre race. He also competed in the individual épée event at the same games.

References

External links

1881 births
1963 deaths
French male cyclists
French male épée fencers
Olympic gold medalists for France
Olympic cyclists of France
Cyclists at the 1900 Summer Olympics
Olympic fencers of France
Fencers at the 1900 Summer Olympics
Place of death missing
Olympic medalists in cycling
Medalists at the 1900 Summer Olympics
UCI Track Cycling World Champions (men)
French track cyclists
Cyclists from Paris